The Windy Point/Windy Flats project, located in Goldendale, Washington, is the largest wind farm in Washington State. The  wind farm spans  along the Columbia River ridgeline and has a capacity of 500 megawatts (MW).

Construction of 400 of the 500 MW was completed by the end of 2009. Cannon Power Group, the project developer, constructed the 400 MW in two phases within 18 months—Phase I (137 MW) and Phase II (262 MW).

Location 

Partners 

The Maryhill Museum of Art has entered into an agreement with Cannon Power Group to site 15 wind turbines on the eastern end of the museum's  in SW Washington State.  According to the American Wind Energy Association, this is believed to be the first wind energy project in the United States to generate revenues for a nonprofit museum. The relationship is now positioned to generate more than $100,000 in revenue for the museum each year.

See also 

 List of power stations in Washington
 Wind power in Washington (state)
 List of wind farms in the United States

Wind farms in Washington (state)